

Walter Adolf Christian Hagen (16 March 1897 – 24 November 1963) was a pilot in the Luftwaffe during World War II and a recipient of the  Knight's Cross of the Iron Cross with Oak Leaves of Nazi Germany.

Awards 
 Clasp to the Iron Cross (1939) 2nd Class (17 September 1939) & 1st Class (9 June 1940)
 Knight's Cross of the Iron Cross with Oak Leaves
 Knight's Cross on 21 July 1940 as "Major" and "Gruppenkommandeur" of the III./Sturzkampfgeschwader 1
 Oak Leaves on 17 February 1942 as Oberstleutnant and Geschwaderkommodore of Sturzkampfgeschwader 1

References

Citations

Bibliography

 
 

1897 births
1963 deaths
Military personnel from Kiel
German Army personnel of World War I
German World War II pilots
Luftwaffe World War II generals
Recipients of the Knight's Cross of the Iron Cross with Oak Leaves
People from the Province of Schleswig-Holstein
Major generals of the Luftwaffe
German test pilots
Luftstreitkräfte personnel
Survivors of aviation accidents or incidents